Alexander Künzler (born 11 July 1962) is a German former boxer. He competed at the 1984 Summer Olympics and the 1988 Summer Olympics.

References

External links
 

1962 births
Living people
German male boxers
Olympic boxers of West Germany
Boxers at the 1984 Summer Olympics
Boxers at the 1988 Summer Olympics
Sportspeople from Pforzheim
Welterweight boxers
20th-century German people
21st-century German people